, better known by his stage name MURO, is a Japanese hip hop recording artist, DJ, record producer and designer. In 1987 DJ Krush, Microphone Pager, TWIGY and others formed the "KRUSH POSSE", a crew of rappers and DJs. During this time he excelled at DJing hip-hop and began producing hip-hop beats. His solo debut appeared 1993. In the late 1990s he worked extensively with Nitro Microphone Underground, one of Japan's most successful hip-hop crews. In addition to producing he also was active as a designer.

Discography

Singles
Street Life (1994/4/21)
THE VINYL ATHLETES (1999/12/22)
EL Carnaval (2000/7/5)
LYRICAL TYRANTS From Local To Global (2001/1/24)
SPACE FUNK 2001 feat. Nipps

Albums
K.M.W.(King Most Wanted) (1999/4/21)
PAN RHYTHM:Flight No.11154 (2000/8/23)
INCREDIBLE!-BLUENOTE DJ MIX by MURO (remix) (2001/5/23)
KING OF DIGGIN' presents…Sweeeet Baaad A＊s Encounter (2002/6/12)
CHAIN REACTION (mini album) (2003/1/22)
BACK II BACK (best of album) (2004/3/10) (CCCD)
BACK II BACK 2 (best of album) (2004/8/25) (CCCD)
20 Street Years Instrumentals Non Stop Mixed by DJ MURO (remix) (2005/7/20)
20 Street Years (2005/7/20)
MURO MUROTIMATE BREAKS&BEATS VOL.1 (best of album) (2006/11/22)
MURO MUROTIMATE BREAKS&BEATS VOL.2 (best of album) (2006/11/22)
TOKYO TRIBE 2 (soundtrack) (2006/11/22)

Featured On
MISIA「つつみ込むように…」 (1998/2/21)
つつみ込むように…(DJ WATARAI REMIX～Featuring MURO)
Zeebra「BASED ON A TRUE STORY」 (2000/6/14)
THE UNTOUCHABLE III featuring MURO
RINO LATINA II「Carnival of Rino」 (2001/12/5)
病む街 PartII 第三章 feat.MURO,TWIGY
キングギドラ「最新兵器」 (2003/10/8)
リアルにやる(MURO Remix)
Nitro Microphone Underground「STRAIGHT FROM THE UNDERGROUND」 (2004/8/25)
10%無理 featuring MURO
マボロシ「ワルダクミ」 (2004/12/8)
SET IT OFF featuring MURO,DABO
MIKRIS「M.A.D.」 (2005/10/5)
OFF THE CHAIN feat.MURO,TAD'S A.C
DJ MASTERKEY「THE ADVENTURES OF DADDY'S HOUSE」 (2006/6/7)
RHYME LINE feat.MURO & BOO
KASHI DA HANDSOME「DIME PIECES」 (2007/3/7)
ALL★STAR feat.MURO,LUNCH TIME SPEAX
Patch Up The Pieces ft. Freddie Foxxx & DJ Muro (Album: DJ Babu Presents Duck Season)
DJ Cam - Honeymoon, Muro-Han-Tome

M2J
"Maware Maware" - Released under the alias M2J (a duo made up of DJ Muro and John Paul "JP" Lam)

References

External links
 – official site

Muro at Myspace

Japanese hip hop
Musicians from Saitama Prefecture
People from Kawaguchi, Saitama
1970 births
Living people